Aleksandar Kavčić (born 1968 in Belgrade) is a Serbian electrical engineer, university professor and philanthropist who is currently active as an Adjunct Professor of Electrical Engineering at the Carnegie Mellon University since 2017 and as a Professor of Electrical Engineering at the University of Hawai'i at Manoa.

Biography
He studied at the prestigious Mathematical Grammar School and University of Belgrade School of Electrical Engineering. After completing his studies, Kavčić moved abroad due to the civil war which took place in former Yugoslavia.

Prior to 2017, Kavčić served as assistant professor, associate professor and professor of electrical engineering at Harvard University and the University of Hawai'i at Manoa where he is presently Professor of Electrical Engineering. He also served as visiting associate professor at the City University of Hong Kong in the Fall of 2005 and as visiting scholar at the Chinese University of Hong Kong in the Spring of 2006.

In 2016, the Carnegie Mellon University won a lawsuit against the Marvell Technology Group for infringing intellectual property of Kavčić and his mentor Jose Moura, gaining a settlement of US$750,000,000.

He is the founded of "Alek Kavčić Foundation" which has the goal to provide high-quality textbooks available for free download for all elementary school students in Serbia. Over the years, he donated new computers to a number of high schools in Serbia.

Kavčić resides in Austin and Belgrade.

Political career 
In the 2020 Serbian parliamentary elections, he was a candidate for MP on the electoral list of the Enough is Enough (DJB) party, and Kavčić was presented as the president of the party education board. The party failed to pass the electoral threshold, and Kavčić decided to leave the party.

Selected works
The Viterbi algorithm and Markov noise memory, co-author, 2000
Binary intersymbol interference channels: Gallager codes, density evolution, and code performance bounds, co-author, 2003
Equal-diagonal QR decomposition and its application to precoder design for successive-cancellation detection,  co-author, 2005
Simulation-based computation of information rates for channels with memory, co-author, 2006
The feasibility of magnetic recording at 10 terabits per square inch on conventional media, co-author, 2009

References

External links
An interview with Kavčić

1968 births
People from Belgrade
Ruhr University Bochum alumni
Living people
Serbian engineers
Electrical engineers
Serbian academics
Carnegie Mellon University faculty
University of Hawaiʻi at Mānoa faculty
Harvard University faculty
Enough is Enough (party) politicians